John Simopoulos (12 June 1923 – 4 March 2015) was a philosopher and fellow of St. Catherine's College, Oxford.

Simopoulos was born in Vienna, the son of Greek diplomat Charalambos Simopoulos, who was serving there. His father was also at one time ambassador to the Court of St James's in London.

References

1923 births
2015 deaths
British philosophers
Alumni of Magdalen College, Oxford
People educated at Stowe School
Fellows of St Catherine's College, Oxford
Austrian emigrants to the United Kingdom